Wannaphon Buspakom (born 2 January 1989) is a Thai professional footballer who plays as a defensive midfielder for Rajpracha.

Personal life 
Wannaphon is the son of former footballer and coach Attaphol Buspakom and older brother of footballer Kanokpon Buspakom.

Club career

He played for Krung Thai Bank in the 2008 AFC Champions League group stages.

References

External links
 Profile at Goal

1989 births
Living people
Wannaphon Buspakom
Wannaphon Buspakom
Wannaphon Buspakom
Wannaphon Buspakom
Wannaphon Buspakom
Wannaphon Buspakom
Wannaphon Buspakom
Wannaphon Buspakom
Association football midfielders